Zhenskii vestnik may refer to:

 Zhenskii vestnik magazine, 1866–1867
 Zhenskii vestnik magazine, 1904–1917